The 2021 San Diego State Aztecs football team represented San Diego State University in the 2021 NCAA Division I FBS football season. The Aztecs were led by head coach Brady Hoke in the second season of his second stint as head coach and played their home games at Dignity Health Sports Park in Carson, California. They competed as members of the West Division of the Mountain West Conference.

Previous season 
In a season initially canceled and then later reinstated due to the ongoing COVID-19 pandemic, the Aztecs finished the 2020 season 4–4, 4–2 in Mountain West play to finish fourth place. The school announced the team would not accept a bowl bid.

Schedule

Game summaries

New Mexico State

at Arizona

Utah

Towson

New Mexico

at San Jose State

at Air Force

Fresno State

at Hawai'i

Nevada

at UNLV

Boise State

Utah State

vs. UTSA

Honors

Conference

 Defensive Player of the Year: Cameron Thomas, DL, Jr.
 Special Teams Player of the Year: Matt Araiza, P/PK, Jr.
 Coach of the Year: Brady Hoke

Rankings

References

San Diego State
San Diego State Aztecs football seasons
Frisco Bowl champion seasons
San Diego State Aztecs football